Dr. John E. Counts is the fourteenth president of Western New Mexico University, a position he held from November 1993 to June 2011. 

Counts  worked at the university as Professor of Management and Director of the Division of Business, Math and Computer Science for one year before becoming president.

References

Heads of universities and colleges in the United States
Year of birth missing (living people)
Living people
United States Army officers
Western New Mexico University faculty